The Treaty for the establishment of the African Medicines Agency is an international treaty, pending ratification and accession by at least 15 Member States of the African Union, to establish the African Medicines Agency (AMA) as a specialized agency of the African Union. The aim of the treaty, by establishing the AMA, is to address the issue of the availability and quality of medical products in Africa by coordinating the continent's regulatory structure regarding the production and distribution of pharmaceuticals, medical devices and other medical products.

History 
The treaty was adopted by the thirty-second ordinary session of the Assembly of the African Union held in Addis Ababa, Ethiopia on 11 February 2019.

Ratification and entry into force 
Article 38 of the treaty requires that 15 Member States of the African Union submit an instrument of ratification and accession in order for the treaty to enter into force, which occurs 30 days after the fifteenth instrument is received by the Chairperson of the African Union Commission.

Provisions 
In addition to the preamble, the treaty consists of 41 articles.

References 

African Union
African Union treaties